Les Perrons (or Le Perron) is a mountain of the Chablais Alps, located on the border between Switzerland and France. The main summit (2,674 m) is named Grand Perron. It overlooks the Lac d'Emosson on its northern side.

References

External links
 Les Perrons on Hikr

Mountains of the Alps
Mountains of Valais
Mountains of Haute-Savoie
France–Switzerland border
International mountains of Europe
Mountains of Switzerland
Two-thousanders of Switzerland